Merika may refer to:

'Merika, a 1984 Philippine film
Merika Coleman (born 1973), an American politician from Alabama
Merika Enne (born 1992), a Finnish snowboarder
Merika, a 2017 album by Elis Lovrić

See also
Merica, a genus of sea snails
America (disambiguation)